Yabuli Ski Resort is the largest ski resort in China and includes the country's largest ski jumping facilities.

Geography 
The Yabuli Ski Resort is located in the Changbai Mountains, one of the major mountain ranges in the northeastern part of China.

Sport events and facilities
Yabuli hosted the 1996 Winter Asian Games, the 2008 National Winter Games and the 2009 Winter Universiade. Yabuli underwent major renovations in the 2008/2009 winter season. A new four seater Doppelmayr chairlift was installed, along with a six-seater gondola. Existing lifts consist of single chairlift, double chairlifts and poma's. Three new on-snow hotels/lodges are being constructed and should be open by mid-January 2009.

2009 Winter Universiade 
In February 2009 Yabuli Ski Resort hosted the Alpine, Nordic, and Freestyle Skiing events of the 2009 Winter Universiade. Student athletes from 44 countries competed in the games. The ice hockey, figure skating, speed skating and curling events were held in the city of Harbin, while the snowboarding events and biathlon were held in Mao'ershan Ski Resort. Yabuli Ski Resort received substantial infrastructure upgrades prior to the games, including a 4-seater chair, gondola, a modern ski hire and hotel  near the base of the resort.

Snowboarding 
2016 World Champions of Snowboarding
2015 FIS Snowboard Junior World Championships

Yabuli Panda House
Yabuli panda house is an important project with conceptual planned by Academy of forestry investigation and planning, China. Yabuli panda house effectively rely on the abundant resource not only plant but also animal of Yabuli with the aim of species protective and science educated. The inspiration of Yabuli panda house is from the shape of leaves. The main material is steel structure, with assistant of glass curtain wall. What is more, it fully take advantage of the gradient of mountain, integrated consider the habit of panda and scenery, make sure that the panda could live a naturally peaceful life in the Yabuli panda house.
Yabuli panda house located in Yabuli ski resort, Shangzhi, China. This project is completed in July, 2016, covered area up to 6500 m2(square). In order to meet the needs of pandas, there has integrated office that is responsible for the monitor in every moment. With the department of bamboo preservation storage, refrigerated storage, kitchen and medical laboratory. The roof outdoor covered by plate metals with the color of copper green. Specially, this color perfectly suit with the green mountain in summer and the snow mountain in winter. The decoration indoor almost covered by bamboo. After all, this is more panda style.
Yabuli panda house divided into four staple parts. Indoor and outdoor area, science educated area and workplace. The surrounding nature is beautiful with abundant plant cover. Meanwhile, when the visitor enjoy the sight of adorable panda in panda house they can also enjoy with the Yabuli ski resort.
Sijia and Youyou live in Yabuli panda house with a good care. Sijia, female, the shape of her head is big and round. She has a standard mouth and mellow body. The hair on her shoulder is little special. Therefore, she got a reputation with Beauty girl. Her character is quite gentle. She can not only eat bamboo, but also bamboo shoot. Sijia is a smart girl with the hobbies of eating, sleeping and sometime she will sticking her tongue out make fun with herself or feeder. Youyou, male, Youyou has a standard body among the panda fashion. He is one of the pandas who has a reputation with World expo panda at the Shanghai world expo in 2010. Youyou likes doing exercise so much. Nevertheless, he is a simple and honest boy with a little timid sometime. Obviously, the most important hobbies are eating and sleeping.

References

External links 

Heilongjiang topics

Buildings and structures in Heilongjiang
Ski areas and resorts in China
Tourist attractions in Heilongjiang
Sport in Heilongjiang